Marsha Kay Carroway Robertson (born December 21, 1947) is an American television personality, best known for her appearances on the A&E reality series Duck Dynasty.

Robertson is the wife of entrepreneur and Duck Dynasty co-star Phil Robertson, and mother of Duck Dynasty personality and current Duck Commander CEO Willie Robertson.

She has a passion for cooking, and often has her entire family over for a home-cooked meal after a long day's work. She is the author of the cookbook Miss Kay's Duck Commander Kitchen: Faith, Family, and Food--Bringing Our Home to Your Table.

Personal life
In high school, Kay was a cheerleader and a debutante.

Kay and Phil Robertson began dating in 1964 and married two years later. Some sources claim she was 16 at the time of her marriage; others indicate she was 17 when she gave birth to her first son, Alan. On an episode of their podcast, Unashamed, Alan said she was born in 1950 and was 15 years old when she had him. They have four sons: Alan, Jase, Willie, and Jep, as well as 16 grandchildren and several great-grandchildren.

In June 2021, Robertson was attacked by her pet dog, Bobo, resulting in damage to her mouth and lips. She reported that she was on a liquid diet and that she would need reconstructive surgery to repair her lips in the future.

Bibliography
Miss Kay's Duck Commander Kitchen: Faith, Family, and Food – Bringing Our Home to Your Table (co-written with Chrys Howard). Simon & Schuster. (2013);

References

1947 births
Living people
American cookbook writers
American debutantes
Participants in American reality television series
American members of the Churches of Christ
Louisiana Republicans
Robertson family
Women cookbook writers
Age controversies
American women non-fiction writers
21st-century American women